The Order of Georgi Dimitrov (or Order of Georgy Dimitrov) was the highest award of the People's Republic of Bulgaria. It was instituted on 17 June 1950 and awarded to Bulgarians and foreigners for outstanding services to the defence and freedom of Bulgaria, or for contributions to socialism. The award was the Bulgarian equivalent of the Order of Lenin, whose general design it imitated.

The award was named after Georgi Dimitrov, the pre-eminent Bulgarian communist of the inter-war and immediate post-war years.

About 4,500 awards were made. The order was automatically awarded to recipients of the Hero of the People's Republic of Bulgaria and Hero of Socialist Labour titles. The award was withdrawn on 5 April 1991.

The medal consisted of a portrait of Dimitrov, surrounded by wreaths of grain, above a label with Dimitrov's name and topped by a small five-pointed star. It was of gilt, apart from the immediate background to Dimitrov's likeness, star and the name label, which were coloured dark red. It was hung on a dark red ribbon with red edges. It was originally designed by K. Lazarov and modified by O. Odabashyan.

Recipients

 Soekarno
 Todor Zhivkov
 Petur Tanchev
 Georgi Atanasov
 Grisha Filipov
 Alexi Ivanov
  Pando Vanchev
 Angel Dimitrov
 Krum Vassilev
Kim Il-sung (twice)
Leonid Brezhnev (thrice)
Yuri Gagarin
Valentina Tereshkova
Wojciech Jaruzelski
Phạm Hùng
Yusuf M. Dadoo

See also
Hero of Labour

References

Orders, decorations, and medals of Bulgaria
Awards established in 1950
Awards disestablished in 1990
Georgi Dimitrov